Jung-min, also spelled Jeong-min or Chung-min, is a Korean unisex given name. Its meaning differs based on the hanja used to write each syllable of the name. There are 75 hanja with the reading "jung" and 27 hanja with the reading "min" on the South Korean government's official list of hanja which may be registered for use in given names.

People with this name include:

Entertainers
Seo Jeong-min (born 1934), South Korean cinematographer
Kim Jung-min (entertainer) (born Kim Jung-soo, 1968), South Korean actor and singer
Hwang Jung-min (born 1970), South Korean actor
Bae Jeong-min (born 1974), South Korean voice actress
Heo Jung-min (born 1982), South Korean actor
Shin So-yul (born Kim Jung-min, 1985), South Korean actress
Park Jung-min (actor) (born 1987), South Korean actor
Park Jung-min (singer) (born 1987), South Korean singer, member of boy band SS501
Seo Eun-soo (born Lee Jeong-min, 1994), South Korean actress

Sportspeople
Choi Chung-min (1930–1983), South Korean football striker
Yang Jung-min (born 1986), South Korean football defender (Chinese Super League)
Park Jeong-min (footballer) (born 1988), South Korean football forward (Korea National League)
Lee Jeong-min (born 1990), South Korean football defender (Philippines Football League)
Kim Jung-min (footballer) (born 1999), South Korean football midfielder (Austrian First League)

See also
List of Korean given names

References

Korean unisex given names